Jatun Mayu (Quechua hatun, jatun great, mayu river, "great river") is a Bolivian river in the Chuquisaca Department, Jaime Zudáñez Province, Icla Municipality. It is a left affluent of the Icla River. It belongs to the watershed of the Pillku Mayu.

References

Rivers of Chuquisaca Department